Ilam is a New Zealand parliamentary electorate.

Population centres
The electorate includes the suburbs of Riccarton (north of Riccarton Road), Upper Riccarton, Fendalton, Burnside, Avonhead, Merivale, Bishopdale, Ilam, Russley and Bryndwr. In 2008, the boundaries were Deans Avenue, the Avon River, Bealey Avenue, Papanui Road, Harewood Road, Russley Road, Ansonby Street, Cutts Road, Yaldhurst Road and Riccarton Road. The 2013/14 redistribution did not alter the boundaries of the Ilam electorate.

History
Gerry Brownlee from the National Party was the first elected representative and held the electorate until 2020, when he lost the electorate to Labour's Sarah Pallett in an upset.

Members of Parliament
Unless otherwise stated, all MPs terms began and ended at a general election.

Key

List MPs
Members of Parliament elected from party lists in elections where that person also unsuccessfully contested the Ilam electorate. Unless otherwise stated, all MPs terms began and ended at general elections.

Election results

2020 election

2017 election

2014 election

2011 election

2008 election

2005 election

2002 election

1999 election

1996 election

Notes

References

New Zealand electorates
Politics of Christchurch